Todd A. Flichel (born September 14, 1964 in Osgoode, Ontario) is a Canadian retired ice hockey defenceman. He played 6 games in the National Hockey League for the Winnipeg Jets between 1987 and 1990. The rest of his career, which lasted from 1988 to 1994, was spent in the minor American Hockey League and International Hockey League

Career statistics

Regular season and playoffs

External links
 

1964 births
Living people
Bowling Green Falcons men's ice hockey players
Canadian ice hockey defencemen
Cincinnati Cyclones (IHL) players
Fort Wayne Komets players
Ice hockey people from Ottawa
Moncton Hawks players
NCAA men's ice hockey national champions
Rochester Americans players
Winnipeg Jets (1979–1996) draft picks
Winnipeg Jets (1979–1996) players